Elvia may refer to:

People
Anna Maria Elvia (1713–1784), Swedish feminist writer
Elvia Allman (1904–1992), American actress
Elvia Alvarado (born 1938), Honduran human rights activist
Elvia Josefina Amador (born 1948), Honduran politician
Elvia Andreoli (1950–2020), Argentine actress
Elvia Violeta Menjívar (born 1952), Salvadoran politician
Elvia María Pérez (born 1954), Mexican politician
María Elvia Amaya Araujo (1954–2012), Mexican politician
Elvia Reyes (born 1956), Honduran fencer
Elvia Hernández García (born 1962), Mexican politician
Elvia Ardalani (born 1963), Mexican writer

Other uses
Elvia (moth), a genus of moths in the family Geometridae